Che is an interjection commonly used in Argentina, Uruguay, Paraguay, Rio Grande do Sul (Brazil)  and Valencia (Spain), signifying "hey!", "fellow", "guy". Che is mainly used as a vocative to call someone's attention (akin to "mate" or "buddy" in English), but it is often used as filler too (akin to "right" or "so" in English). The Argentine revolutionary Ernesto "Che" Guevara earned his nickname from his frequent use of the expression, which was perceived as foreign by his Cuban comrades.

Etymology
 is an interjection of unclear origin.

Due to its spread in South America, alternative etymologies have been suggested by analogy with indigenous words:

In Tupi-Guarani, spoken by certain ethnic groups from Argentina to Brazil,  means simply "I" or "my."
In the native Araucanian and Chonan language families of the Southern Cone,  means "man" or "people" and is often used as a suffix for ethnonyms in these languages (such as Mapuche, Huilliche, Tehuelche, and Puelche).
 In Kimbundu, spoken by Congolese slaves during colonial times,  means "hey!", an interjection for calling someone.

Usage

("Hey, you black witch, get out of here before I gash you," said the butcher.)

Falkland Islands
In the Falkland Islands,  is commonly used by English speakers (""). It can also be written as "". The word is sometimes used to describe someone who is a particularly traditional Falkland Islander ("").

Valencia
In Spain,  is widely used in Valencia and Terres de l'Ebre, Catalonia (written as ), as an interjection. With the spelling "" in Valencian, its main use is to express protest, surprise or exasperation.  is one of the symbols of the Valencian identity to the point where, for example the Valencia CF is often referred to with the nickname "Xe Team".

Philippines
In the Philippines,  (also spelled ) is used to express the dismissing another person or interrupting another person's speech, similar in context to the English expression "Shut up!".

See also
 Argot
 Cocoliche
 Lunfardo
 Re (exclamation) - a similar interjection in the Balkans of identical usage 
 Vesre

References

External links

Che Guevara
Languages of Argentina
Spanish slang